Escallonia bifida, the cloven gum box, is an evergreen shrub or small tree in the family Escalloniaceae. It is native to Brazil and Uruguay.

The pure white flowers, initially tubular but then spreading, appear in summer.

It is sparingly naturalised in New South Wales in Australia. In colder areas it requires the protection of a wall. It has gained the Royal Horticultural Society’s Award of Garden Merit.

The Latin specific epithet bifida means “cleft in two”.

References

bifida
Flora of Brazil
Flora of Uruguay
Flora naturalised in Australia